Jones's van is the butcher's delivery van, owned by Lance-Corporal Jones, which first made an appearance in the BBC comedy series Dad's Army. It is a 1935 two-ton Ford BB Box Van with the registration plate BUC 852 and appeared in Dad's Army from 1969 to 1977; it was also seen in the 2016 film based on the series. In 2012 the van was sold to the Dad's Army Museum in Thetford.

Dad's Army
While it is doubtful that a small local butcher like Jones would have needed so large a van in real life, let alone have been able to finance its running costs during wartime, the van becomes essential in the series as a means of moving the Walmington-on-Sea platoon about. The platoon uses Jones's van as transport and an improvised IFV for their manoeuvres.

Jones is very proud of his van, and is often reluctant to allow various modifications needed for the platoon's activities. The instances when Mainwaring causes the van to get damaged are the very rare occasions when Jones becomes upset with his captain, at one point threatening to blacklist Mainwaring from his sausage list; to which Mainwaring replies carefully, "Steady, Jones."

In the 1969 episode "The Armoured Might of Lance Corporal Jones" (which was the first Dad's Army episode to be made in colour), the van is converted to run on coal gas, with a large bag full of the gas put on the roof. In the same episode the van is shown with covered holes built into the side panels, so that the platoon can fire their rifles through them. They demonstrate how it works, while chanting, "Open-two-three. Out-two-three. Bang-two-three. Bang-two-three. Bang-two-three. In-two-three. Shut!"

History

Corporal Jones's van is a 1935 two-ton Ford BB, one of the first commercial models produced at Ford's Dagenham factory when it opened in 1931. It was discovered in a dilapidated condition in Streatham in London by Frank Holland, an assistant property master for the BBC. Such was its condition that the van was on the verge of being scrapped. Holland contacted Fred Wilmington, whose company supplied vehicles to the BBC; he purchased the van and restored it to full working order.

Later Paul Joel, a designer working on Dad's Army, spotted the van among Wilmington's stock of vehicles and obtained it for use in the series. The van was repainted and had "J. Jones Family Butcher" sign-painted on its side panels. The van still has its original engine from 1935.

Screen appearances

Jones's van made its screen debut in Dad's Army on 11 September 1969 in the episode "The Armoured Might of Lance Corporal Jones", the first in the series to be made in colour (the episode "Branded" was the first to be transmitted in colour). The van continued to make regular appearances until the series ended in 1977.

In 1979 the original van was seen in Dick Barton - Special Agent with the distinctive side panels covered and the van filmed through a green filter to further disguise it.

A different van was used for the 1971 Dad's Army film, namely a closed cab Ford Model AA with a box roof added so that the platoon could stand inside it. This is on show at the Bressingham Steam and Gardens exhibition.

The original van was used again in the 2016 Dad's Army film.

Move to Thetford
When Dad's Army ended in 1977 the original Ford BB van was sold to a Ford Dealer in Finchley and then sold again in 1991 to the Patrick Motor Museum in Birmingham for a hammer price of £11,200. In 2012 the van was auctioned by Bonhams, when it was sold to the Dad's Army Museum in Thetford for £63,100 including the buyer's premium. The van went on display at the Charles Burrell Museum in early 2013 after a period of cosmetic restoration.

The van's engine underwent a full rebuild by a local firm of engineers ready to run for the 2017 museum season. On 11 November 2017 the van and volunteers from the Dad's Army Museum took part in the Lord Mayor's Show.

Merchandise
Various toy versions of Jones's van were commercially available, including one made as part of a series of Dad's Army and wartime vehicles by the BBC, while Corgi released 1:50 scale models of a Thornycroft van as Jones butcher's van and a Bedford 0 Series as that belonging to Hodges. Each came with a figurine of the character.

References

Dad's Army
Fictional cars